Fujian-class tanker is a class of naval auxiliary ship currently in service with the People's Liberation Army Navy (PLAN), and has received NATO reporting name Fujian class. The exact type designation still remains unknown, and a total of twenty of this class have been confirmed in active service as of early-2020s, both in transport oil tanker and water tanker versions.

Fujian class ships in PLAN service are designated by a combination of two Chinese characters followed by a three-digit number. The second Chinese character is You (油), meaning oil in Chinese, because these ships are classified as oil tankers. The first Chinese character denotes which fleet the ship is service with, with East (Dong, 东) for East Sea Fleet, North (Bei, 北) for North Sea Fleet, and South (Nan, 南) for South Sea Fleet. However, the pennant numbers are subject to change due to changes of Chinese naval ships naming convention, or when units are transferred to different fleets. Specification:

Length: 72 meter

References

Auxiliary ships of the People's Liberation Army Navy